Albert Mountain is a mountain in North Carolina's Nantahala Range of the Appalachian Mountains. A fire tower offers views of the Blue Ridge and the Little Tennessee River valley.

Name
Albert Mountain is named after Albert Siler (1829-1904), a local resident. Nearby geographic features are also named after Siler's family, such as Siler Bald (not to be confused with Silers Bald), named after Albert's father William Siler and Rufus Morgan Falls, named after Siler's grandson Rufus Morgan.

Geography
Albert Mountain is located inside the Nantahala National Forest in Macon County.

Fire tower
A log lookout cabin has existed on Albert's Mountain since as early as 1942. In 1951, a steel tower was built on Albert Mountain's summit to supplant the abandoned lookout towers on Big Pinnacle Mountain and Standing Indian Mountain and to provide fire detection for the Coweeta Hydrologic Laboratory. The tower offers views of the Nantahala Mountains and the Little Tennessee River valley. The Great Smoky Mountains and the Great Balsam Mountains are also visible from the fire tower.

Hiking
The 100 mile mark of the Appalachian Trail is at the top of Albert Mountain as the trail passes over the summit. From Bearpen Gap, the hike is about  up to the summit.

See also
List of mountains in North Carolina

References

Albert